Collessie railway station served the village of Collessie, Fife, Scotland from 1847 to 1955 on the Edinburgh and Northern Railway.

History 
The station opened on 20 September 1847 by the Edinburgh and Northern Railway. The station closed to both passengers and goods traffic on 19 September 1955.

References

External links 

Disused railway stations in Fife
Former North British Railway stations
Railway stations in Great Britain opened in 1847
Railway stations in Great Britain closed in 1955
1847 establishments in Scotland
1955 disestablishments in Scotland